The Asin–Nangalisan–San Pascual Road (also known as the Baguio–Tubao Road, Tubao–Asin Road or Asin Road) is a major road in La Union and Benguet, Philippines. This road is dangerous, and has tunnels along the way which used to be intended for rail services from Aringay to Baguio. The road officially opened to public on December 17, 2018.

This road name is derived from the Filipino word for "salt". There are resorts and hotsprings, such as Pooten's Resort, Palm Grove Hot Springs and Mountains Resort, Asin Hot Spring, Riverview Water Park, and Neverland Mountain Resort.

The segment of the road in Baguio forms part of National Route 234 (N234) and National Route 233 (N233) of the Philippine highway network. The rest of the road leading to Tubao, La Union remains unnumbered and classified as a tertiary national road. Recently, due to Marcos Highway suffering heavy traffic, the road was rehabilitated to serve as an alternative route down to La Union, but there a some more adjustments left.

Route description 
The Asin–Nangalisan–San Pascual Road serves as an alternative route to Baguio, and is also the fourth that leads to Baguio from the northwestern lowlands of Luzon. The road also helps decongest the traffic in Marcos Highway, despite being slightly longer than the said road.

The road starts at the junction of Marcos Highway (N208) in Tubao, La Union as a four-lane road. Its features have many of the lightning and reflectorized signages and bus terminals. The Anduyan Bridge, which spans , carries along the route. After crossing the span, the road is narrowed to two lanes (one per direction) upon traversing the higher elevation that contains sharp curves and steep elevation upon entering Benguet province.

Intersections

References

Roads in Benguet
Baguio
Roads in La Union